Franciscus Cornelis Gerardus Maria (Frans) Timmermans (born 6 May 1961) is a Dutch politician and diplomat serving as First Vice President of the European Commission since 2014. Since 2019, Timmermans has served in the von der Leyen Commission as Executive Vice President of the European Commission for the European Green Deal and European Commissioner for Climate Action.

He previously served as First Vice-President to Jean-Claude Juncker and European Commissioner for Better Regulation, Interinstitutional Relations, the Rule of Law and the Charter of Fundamental Rights from 2014 to 2019. He was the lead candidate of the Party of European Socialists (PES) for President of the European Commission in the European election that was held in May 2019.

Timmermans was Minister of Foreign Affairs of the Netherlands from 2012 to 2014 in the Second Rutte cabinet and State Secretary for Foreign Affairs from 2007 to 2010 in the Fourth Balkenende cabinet, in charge of European Affairs. He was a member of the Dutch House of Representatives for the Labour Party from 1998 to 2007 and again 2010 to 2012. He was a civil servant in the diplomatic service of the Netherlands from 1987 to 1998, when he became active in politics.

Early life and education
Timmermans was born on 6 May 1961 in Maastricht to a Roman Catholic family. He attended elementary school in Sint-Stevens-Woluwe, Belgium before attending, from 1972 to 1975, the private Saint George's English School in Rome. From 1975 until 1980, he attended the athenaeum Bernardinuscollege in Heerlen, where he settled.

In 1980, Timmermans entered the Radboud University Nijmegen, where he graduated with an MA degree in French Literature in 1985. In 1984, he also enrolled at the Nancy-Université in Nancy, France, where he studied European law, French Literature and History, obtaining LL.M. Eur and MA degrees in 1985. On 6 January 1986, he was conscripted in the Royal Netherlands Army as a private first class for the Dutch Military Intelligence and Security Service as a Russian Prisoner of War interrogator.

Aside from his native Dutch, Timmermans is fluent in English, French, German, Italian and Russian.

Diplomatic career
On 1 August 1987, Timmermans was discharged from military service in the Royal Netherlands Army. Timmermans joined the Dutch Civil Service as an officer in the Integration Department at the Ministry of Foreign Affairs, in The Hague. On 1 July 1990, he was appointed Deputy Secretary of the Dutch Embassy in Moscow, Russia. On 1 September 1993, he returned to the Ministry of Foreign Affairs, as Deputy Head of the Bureau for European Development Cooperation. On 15 March 1994, he left the Ministry of Foreign Affairs becoming Assistant to European Commissioner Hans van den Broek. Timmermans moved from this post a year later on 15 March 1995, to become Senior Advisor and Private Secretary to Max van der Stoel, the High Commissioner for National Minorities of the Organization for Security and Co-operation in Europe (OSCE).

Political career

Member of the House of Representatives
After the Dutch general election of 1998 Timmermans was elected a Member of the House of Representatives for the Labour Party and was installed as Member of the House of Representatives on 19 May 1998. He served as the Deputy Chairman of the Commission for Foreign Affairs from November 2001 until September 2002 when he became the Chairman of the Commission for Economic Affairs until 18 March 2003 when he again became the Deputy Chairman of the Commission for Foreign Affairs serving until 22 February 2007. Timmermans represented the House of Representatives, in the Convention on the Future of Europe from March 2002 until July 2003. Timmermans also served as a Member of the Parliamentary Assembly of the Council of Europe from 21 September 1998 until 22 February 2007. Timmermans was reelected to the House of Representatives after the Dutch general elections of 2002 and 2003.

Undersecretary
After the Dutch general election of 2006 the Labour Party, Christian Democratic Appeal (CDA) and the ChristianUnion (CU) formed a coalition agreement which resulted in the formation of the Cabinet Balkenende IV. Timmermans became Undersecretary for Foreign Affairs and was responsible for the co-ordination of government policy towards the European Union, and was conferred the diplomatic title of Minister of European Affairs during international visits. A major theme of his time as Undersecretary for European Affairs was to increase support for European integration. This was done both by seeking greater influence of citizens on European policies and by improving communication and public perception; besides citizens the aim was that education should have also be more involved with Europe. The Treaty of Lisbon was signed whilst he was Undersecretary, before which Timmermans and Prime Minister Jan Peter Balkenende successfully lobbied to secure a greater role for national parliaments in European Union decision-making processes. In February 2010, NATO officially requested the Netherlands to extend its military involvement in Task Force Uruzgan. The Labour Party strongly opposed the extension of the mission and on 23 February 2010 the Cabinet Balkenende IV fell after the Labour Party officially withdrew its support with all Labour Party Cabinet members resigning.

Return as a Member of the House of Representatives
Following the withdrawal of the Labour Party from the coalition government, the Cabinet Balkenende IV remained as a Demissionary Cabinet until the Dutch general election of 2010. Following a coalition agreement between the People's Party for Freedom and Democracy (Vvd), Christian Democratic Appeal (CDA) and the Party for Freedom (PVV), the Labour Party became the official opposition. Timmermans was returned to the House of Representatives, being installed on 17 June 2010. During his second term as a Member of the House of Representatives he served as Parliamentary Spokesman of the Labour Party for Foreign Affairs and European Affairs. Labour politician Ronald Plasterk accused Timmermans in 2016 of doing nothing for half a year in order to acquire this responsibility, which had initially been refused because of his previous office. He declined to comment.

Minister of Foreign Affairs

After the fall of the Cabinet Rutte I. The Dutch general election of 2012, resulted in the Labour Party and the People's Party for Freedom and Democracy forming a coalition agreement resulting in the formation of the Cabinet Rutte II, and Timmermans being appointed Minister of Foreign Affairs, taking office on 5 November 2012.

On 24 March and 25 March 2014 the Netherlands hosted the 2014 Nuclear Security Summit, Timmermans as Minister of Foreign Affairs was charged with welcoming all attending representatives.

In May 2014, Timmermans condemned Geert Wilders' anti-Islam sticker, saying that "The Netherlands cannot be held responsible for the adolescent behavior of a single parliamentarian." Timmermans said that Saudi Arabia is "deeply offended by the sticker action."

On 17 July 2014, passenger flight Malaysia Airlines Flight 17 was shot down over Ukraine resulting in the deaths of 194 Dutch citizens. The next day Timmermans flew to Kyiv to meet with President Petro Poroshenko and Prime Minister Arseniy Yatsenyuk to discuss the matter, following which, on 21 July 2014, Timmermans addressed the United Nations Security Council in New York. Timmermans delivered an emotional speech which was widely praised by the international community. His speech called for Dutch Prime Minister Rutte and the International Community to help bring the victims home and start an investigation to make sure that those responsible are brought to justice. He states: "I call on the international community, on the Security Council, on anyone with influence on the situation on the ground: allow us to bring the victims’ remains home to their loved ones without any further delay. They deserve to be home." A statement in his speech about the careless way with which the local population was said to have treated the bodies of the victims appeared to be imprecise. Timmermans acknowledged this later on in a letter to the Dutch parliament.

In August 2014, Timmermans called for an independent investigation into Israel's actions during the 2014 Israel–Gaza conflict. 

In a speech at the Israel Council on Foreign Relations Timmermans explains the interconnectedness between Israel and Europe. These similarities, culture-wise and governmentally, mean that Europe holds Israel to a higher standard: namely, as a European country rather than a Middle Eastern country. While this double standard could be perceived as antisemitic, Timmermans points out that "there is no way we can disentangle the destiny of Israel from the destiny of Europe". In pointing out this connection, Timmermans alludes to the responsibility that Europe has to maintain positive relations with Israel. While recognizing how young people in Europe are facing "rising disenchantment" to democracy, he calls on the European community to "help us find new, innovative ways of translating this inherent human necessity to be heard, to influence one's environment to be part of the decision making process". He believes the Netherlands should help fortify security guarantees for Israel, but cautions that Israel must be willing to give Palestinians full and equal rights in the West Bank and in Gaza.

European Commission (2014–2019)

In September 2014, the Dutch Government nominated Frans Timmermans as its prospective member of the European Commission under President-elect Jean-Claude Juncker. On 1 November 2014, Timmermans took office as First Vice President in Juncker's European Commission, and served as President Juncker's first deputy and right-hand man. Timmermans' portfolio comprises Better Regulation, Inter-Institutional Relations, Rule of Law and Charter of Fundamental Rights.

In May 2016, Timmermans said that Erdoğan's Turkey "has made impressive progress, particularly in recent weeks, on meeting the benchmarks of its visa liberalisation roadmap. There is still work to be done as a matter of urgency but if Turkey sustains the progress made, they can meet the remaining benchmarks."

Timmermans repeatedly criticized Poland's judiciary reform, saying that "these laws considerably increase the systemic threats to the rule of law in Poland." In April 2019, the Commission had launched a new infringement proceedings against Poland over independence of judges. Timmermans said: "The new disciplinary regime undermines the judicial independence of Polish judges by not offering necessary guarantees to protect them from political control, as required by the Court of Justice of the European Union."

Timmermans supported the mandatory migrant quotas within the EU. He said that people coming to the EU "are fellow human beings who, I think, deserve to seek refuge when they flee the barbarism that the jihadists are inflicting upon them."

Unsuccessful candidacy for the European Commission presidency

In October 2018, Frans Timmermans announced his candidacy for the office of President of the European Commission ahead of the 2019 European election.
In December 2018, during the Congress of Lisbon, the Party of European Socialists acclaimed him as its candidate. He was formally nominated as the PES Common Candidate in Madrid in February 2019. Timmermans said he intended to challenge the dominance of the EPP by building a left coalition in the European Parliament. His party finished second in the election behind the EPP, but after having discussed the parliamentary lead candidates Manfred Weber, Timmermans and occasionally also Margrethe Vestager of the three largest European parties in the parliament several times, the European Council initially intended to nominate Timmermans for the office of commission president mostly because of Weber's alleged missing experience on the international stage. However, when governments from Eastern Europe protested this decision because of their strong opposition against Timmerman's fight on behalf of the commission for the rule of law and against reforms which are prospected to undermine it in these countries, the Council almost unanimously proposed German Defense Minister Ursula von der Leyen as a compromise candidate in July 2019, a controversial decision among many members of the European Parliament, as she had neither been running for the office nor taken part in the European election, while such a process had informally been agreed as the gold standard since 2014. Therefore, the sole abstention with her nomination came from Germany themselves because part of the German coalition government did not accept such a move. Yet, von der Leyen was subsequently elected with a narrow majority by the European Parliament, promised to argue for a better implementation and formalisation of the desired parliamentary process in the future and announced that lead candidates Timmermans and Vestager would become Vice-Presidents in her commission.

European Commission (2019–present)

In 2019, President of the European Commission, Ursula von der Leyen requested Frans Timmermans continue in his role as First Vice President while also designating him as one of the three new Executive Vice Presidents of the European Commission. As Executive Vice President, Timmermans is responsible for the European Green Deal. Timmermans was also responsible for a European Green Deal and a European Climate Law in their first hundred days in office.

On 30 March 2021, Timmermans said in a tweet after talking to Swedish environmental activist Greta Thunberg that "The Commission remains committed" to making the Common Agricultural Policy "fulfill the objectives" of the European Green Deal.

In October 2021, Timmermans suggested "the best answer" to the 2021 global energy crisis is "to reduce our reliance on fossil fuels." He said those blaming the European Green Deal were doing so "for perhaps ideological reasons or sometimes economic reasons in protecting their vested interests." Euractiv reported that Timmermans told the European Parliament in Strasbourg "that “about one fifth” of the energy price increase can be attributed to rising CO2 prices on the EU’s carbon market."

Personal life
Timmermans has married twice, having two children in his first marriage, a daughter (born 1986) and a son (born 1989). Timmermans remarried in 2000 to Irene Timmermans; he and his second wife have a son (born 2004) and a daughter (born 2006). In 2021, he appeared on the Time 100, Times annual list of the 100 most influential people in the world and was named one of the 28 most influential people in Europe (in the "Doers" category) by Politico Europe.

Honours and decorations

Decorations
 Commander of the Order For Merit (Romania, 2006)
 Officer of the Order of Merit of the Republic of Poland (Poland, 2006)
 Knight of the Legion of Honour (France, 2007)
 Grand Cross of the Order of the Southern Cross (Brazil, 2008)
 1st Class of the Order of the Cross of Terra Mariana (Estonia, 2008)
 Grand Cross of the Order of the Lithuanian Grand Duke Gediminas (Lithuania, 2008)
 Commander of the Order of the Polar Star (Sweden, 2009)
 Grand Cross of the Order of Merit (Chile, 2009)
 Knight of the Order of Orange-Nassau (Netherlands, 2010)
 Golden Palm Decoration of Honour (Bulgaria, 2018)

Honorary degrees
 On 16 January 2015, Timmermans was awarded an honorary doctorate from the Faculty of Arts and Social Sciences of Maastricht University.
On 11 March 2019, he was awarded the title doctor honoris causa by National University of Political Studies and Public Administration (SNSPA) in Bucharest, Romania.

See also
Climate change mitigation

Notes

References

External links
 

|-

|-

|-

|-

|-

1961 births
Chevaliers of the Légion d'honneur
Commanders of the Order of the Polar Star
Dutch columnists
Dutch European Commissioners
Dutch expatriates in Austria
Dutch expatriates in Belgium
Dutch expatriates in France
Dutch expatriates in Italy
Dutch expatriates in Russia
Dutch political writers
Dutch Roman Catholics
First Vice-Presidents of the European Commission
Grand Crosses of the Order of the Lithuanian Grand Duke Gediminas
Knights of the Order of Orange-Nassau
Labour Party (Netherlands) politicians
Living people
Members of the House of Representatives (Netherlands)
Ministers of Foreign Affairs of the Netherlands
Officers of the Order of Merit of the Republic of Poland
People from Heerlen
Politicians from Maastricht
Radboud University Nijmegen alumni
Recipients of the Order of the Cross of Terra Mariana, 1st Class
Royal Netherlands Army personnel
State Secretaries for Foreign Affairs of the Netherlands
University of Lorraine alumni
20th-century Dutch civil servants
20th-century Dutch diplomats
20th-century Dutch politicians
21st-century Dutch civil servants
21st-century Dutch diplomats
21st-century Dutch male writers
21st-century Dutch politicians
European Commissioners 2014–2019
European Commissioners 2019–2024